Aisovo (Ayıs) is a rural locality (a village) in Inzersky Selsoviet, Beloretsky District, Bashkortostan, Russia. The population was 22 as of 2010. There is one street.

Geography 
Aisovo is located 126 km northwest of Beloretsk (the district's administrative centre) by road. Aryshparovo is the nearest rural locality.

References

Rural localities in Beloretsky District